Mira is a village in Sultanpur Lodhi tehsil in Kapurthala district of Punjab, India. The village is administrated by a Sarpanch who is an elected representative of village as per the constitution of India and Panchayati raj (India).

Demography 
According to the report published by Census India in 2011, Mira has 60 houses with the total population of 287 persons of which 141 are male and 146 females. Literacy rate of Mira is 66.67%, lower than the state average of 75.84%.  The population of children in the age group 0–6 years is 38 which is 13.24% of the total population.  Child sex ratio is approximately 1923, higher than the state average of 846.

Population data

Work Profile 
In Mira village out of total population, 99 were engaged in work activities.  94.95% of workers describe their work as Main Work (Employment or Earning more than 6 Months) while 5.05% were involved in Marginal activity providing livelihood for less than 6 months. Of 99 workers engaged in Main Work, 16 were cultivators (owner or co-owner) while 42 were Agricultural labourer.

Caste 
In Mira village, most of the villagers are from Schedule Caste (SC). Schedule Caste (SC) constitutes  46.34% of total population in Mira village. The village Mira currently doesn’t have any Schedule Tribe (ST) population.

References

List of cities near the village 
Bhulath
Kapurthala 
Phagwara 
Sultanpur Lodhi

Air travel connectivity 
The closest International airport to the village is Sri Guru Ram Dass Jee International Airport.

External links
 Villages in Kapurthala
 List of Villages in Kapurthala Tehsil

Villages in Kapurthala district